"Hit or Miss" is the debut single by New Found Glory originally from their 1999 debut studio album, Nothing Gold Can Stay.

In 2000, "Hit or Miss" was re-recorded for the band's second studio album, New Found Glory. The new version charted at number 15 on the Billboard Modern Rock Tracks chart in April 2001 and number 58 on the UK Singles Chart in June 2001. The new version appeared in American Pie 2 and The Benchwarmers.

Charts

Weekly charts

Track listing
CD single
"Hit or Miss (Waited Too Long)" – 3:22
"So Many Ways" – 2:59
"You've Got a Friend in Pennsylvania" – 3:59
Hit or Miss (Waited Too Long) – Video

References

1999 songs
2000 debut singles
New Found Glory songs
Songs written by Steve Klein (musician)
Songs written by Chad Gilbert
MCA Records singles
Song recordings produced by Neal Avron
Songs written by Jordan Pundik
Songs written by Ian Grushka
Songs written by Cyrus Bolooki